The Order of Military Merit is an award of the Brazilian Army, established on 11 July 1934 by President Getúlio Vargas. The order is presented in five grades and recognizes distinguished service and exceptional contributions to Brazil by members the Brazilian Army and the armies of friendly nations.

The grades, in descending order, are:
  Grand Cross
  Grand Officer
  Commander
  Officer
  Knight

Notable recipients

 Edward Almond, American
 Henry H. Arnold, American
 Kaúlza de Arriaga, Portuguese, Grand Officer 
 Amaro Soares Bittencourt, Brazilian
 Waldemar Levy Cardoso, Brazilian
Frank P. Connelly, Jr. American
 Charles de Gaulle, French
 Carlos Alberto dos Santos Cruz, Brazilian
 Ciro Ferreira Gomes, Brazilian
 Hernán Terrazas Céspedes, Bolivian, Grand Officer.
 Dwight D. Eisenhower, American, Grand Cross (August 5, 1946)
 John W. Foss, American, Grand Cross
 Paul L. Freeman, Jr., American
 Leonard T. Gerow, American
 William C. Gribble, Jr., American
 Elvin R. Heiberg III, American
 Jonas H. Ingram, American
 Allan Ker VC, Scot
 Thomas B. Larkin, American
 Lyman Lemnitzer, American
 Luiz Inácio Lula da Silva, Brazilian
George C. Marshall, American, Grand Cross
 Joseph T. McNarney, American
 Raymond T. Odierno, American, Grand Officer
 James Garesche Ord, American, Grand Officer
 General Raheel Sharif, Pakistani, COAS Army 
 Lemuel C. Shepherd, Jr., American Grand Officer (1959)
 Walter Bedell Smith, American, Grand Cross (September 6, 1947)
 Gordon R. Sullivan, American
 Richard Horner Thompson, American
 Tércio Pacitti, Brazilian
 Togo D. West, Jr., American
 Frederick L. Wieseman, American
 Jair Bolsonaro, Brazilian
 Lieutenant-General Paul Wynnyk, Canadian Grand Officer (July 28, 2018),
 Bertrand of Orléans-Braganza, Brazilian

References

Orders, decorations, and medals of Brazil

Brazilian Army
1934 establishments in Brazil
Awards established in 1934